Stomio is a village in the Cretan municipality of Ierapetra located 1.2 km west of Gra Lygia. Stomio's residents are called "Stomiotes".

Ierapetra